Lee Phillips may refer to the following people:

Lee Phillips (footballer, born 1979), Welsh-born footballer
Lee Phillips (footballer, born 1980), English footballer
Lee H. Phillips (Lee Hugh Phillips, 1930–1950), American Medal of Honor recipient
L. Lee Phillips, entertainment lawyer with Manatt, Phelps & Phillips

See also
Philip Lee (disambiguation)
Lee Philips (1927–1999), American actor and director 
Grant-Lee Phillips (born 1963), American singer-songwriter 
Lee Phillip Bell (1928–2020), American talk show host as Lee Phillip
Lee Phillip (born 1981), Korean-American actor